Sidi Ziane is a town and commune in Médéa Province, Algeria. According to the 1998 census, it had a population of 3,282.

References

Communes of Médéa Province
Cities in Algeria
Algeria